Blue Train may refer to:

Rail 
 Blue Train (South Africa), a South African luxury train
 Blue Train (Japan), the generic name for sleeping car trains in Japan
 The Blue Train (fr. Le Train Bleu), a train that ran between Calais and the French Riviera
 Le Train Bleu (ballet), a ballet by Bronislava Nijinska, music by Darius Milhaud, scenario by Jean Cocteau, set by Henri Laurens, Chanel and Picasso (Ballets Russes, 1924)
 British Rail Class 303 or Blue Train, electric suburban trains introduced on the North Clyde Line and elsewhere in the Glasgow area
 Blue Train (Yugoslavia), referred to as Tito's Blue Train, a luxury train used by former Yugoslav President Josip Broz Tito
 Blue Train (Turkey), passenger train service in Turkey

Other uses 
 Le Train Bleu (restaurant) or The Blue Train, a restaurant
 Blue Train, a nickname for the U.S. Postal Service cycling team
 The Mystery of the Blue Train, a work of detective fiction by Agatha Christie set on Le Train Bleu
  Blue Train, a 2010 Serbian film on life after the death of Tito

Music

Albums
 Blue Train (album), a 1958 jazz album by John Coltrane

Songs
 "Blue Train" (composition), 1957 jazz standard by John Coltrane
 "Blue Train" (Asian Kung-Fu Generation song), a 2005 song by Asian Kung-Fu Generation
 "Blue Train" (Billie Holiday song), a song by Billie Holiday
 "Blue Train" (Johnny Cash song), a song by Johnny Cash
 "Blue Train" (Linda Ronstadt song), a song by Linda Ronstadt
 "Blue Train", a song by Cibo Matto from Stereo * Type A
 "Blue Train", a song by Lord Rockingham's XI
 "Blue Train", a song by Page and Plant composed by Jimmy Page, Robert Plant, Charlie Jones and Michael Lee

See also
 Blue Line (disambiguation)
 Blue Pullman (disambiguation), trainsets operated by British Railways
 Blue Train Races, a series of record-breaking attempts between automobiles and trains
 Blue Train Bentley, two automobiles involved in the Blue Train Races
 All Aboard the Blue Train, a 1962 album by Johnny Cash
 Blues Train, moving musical entertainment, Victoria, Australia